Wyszków may refer to the following places in Poland:
Wyszków, Węgrów County in Masovian Voivodeship (east-central Poland)
Wyszków, Wyszków County, a town in Masovian Voivodeship (east-central Poland)
Wyszków, Lower Silesian Voivodeship (south-west Poland)
Wyszków, Opole Voivodeship (south-west Poland)